Saale-Orla is a Kreis (district) in the east of Thuringia, Germany. Neighboring districts are (from the north clockwise) the districts Saale-Holzland, Greiz, the Vogtlandkreis in Saxony, the Bavarian districts Hof and Kronach, and the district Saalfeld-Rudolstadt.

History
The district was created in 1994 by merging the previous districts Lobenstein, Pößneck and Schleiz.

Geography
The main rivers in the district are the Saale and the Orla, which also contributed to the name of the district. The highest elevation with 732.9 m above sea level is the Sieglitzberg (near Lobenstein), the lowest with 180 m is near Schimmersburg Langenorla. The district is mountainous, covering the Thüringer Schiefergebirge. The dams of the Saale create the biggest system of artificial lakes in Germany.

Coat of arms
The two lions in the top of the coat of arms represent the historic states which covered the area in the past. In the left is the lion with crown of the Reuß family, while the lion to the right is the symbol of the margravate of Meißen. The two wavy lines in the bottom symbolize the two rivers of the district, Saale and Orla.

Towns and municipalities

References

External links
Official website (German)
Touristic website (German, English)

 
Districts of Thuringia